The sixteenth  series of Comedy Playhouse, the long-running BBC series, aired during 2014, with only three episodes.

Background
The sixteenth series, consisted of three episodes, each of which had a different cast and storyline. It was announced that Miller's Mountain was going to be made into a series, whereas Monks was not. No decision was announced regarding Over to Bill. 

Miller's Mountain was renamed Mountain Goats and a six-part series aired on BBC One from 14 August 2015. The series received overwhelmingly negative reviews.

Episodes

References

Further reading
Mark Lewisohn, "Radio Times Guide to TV Comedy", BBC Worldwide Ltd, 2003

External links
British TV Comedy Guide for Comedy Playhouse
Comedy Playhouse, a TV Heaven Review

Comedy Playhouse (series 16)